Ekkehard Kyrath (20 July 1909 – 20 January 1962) was a German cinematographer.

Selected filmography

References

Bibliography 
 Giesen, Rolf. Nazi Propaganda Films: A History and Filmography. McFarland, 2003.

External links 
 

1909 births
1962 deaths
German cinematographers
People from Koszalin